Samuel McDonnell (1834 – January 1, 1910) was a Canadian politician.

Born in St. Andrews, County of Antigonish, Nova Scotia, the son of Donald McDonnell (Garanaich) and Mary Macdonald, McDonnell studied law in Antigonish with William Alexander Henry. After being admitted to the bar in 1862, he practiced law in Port Hood, Nova Scotia. In 1863, he was elected to the Nova Scotia House of Assembly in Inverness. He married Annie, the daughter of Peter Smyth in 1866 and was named Queen's Counsel the following year. In 1867 MacDonnell ran in Inverness for the House of Commons of Canada, but was defeated. He was elected to the provincial assembly again in 1871. In 1872, he was elected to Parliament as a member of John A. Macdonald's Conservative caucus. After the Pacific scandal, he switched parties to the Liberals in 1874. He was re-elected in 1878 and defeated in 1882, 1887, and 1891. He was later appointed by the Laurier Government an Inspector of Customs for Eastern Nova Scotia.

McDonnell died at Port Hood at the age of 76.

References
 

1834 births
1910 deaths
Conservative Party of Canada (1867–1942) MPs
Liberal Party of Canada MPs
Members of the House of Commons of Canada from Nova Scotia
Progressive Conservative Association of Nova Scotia MLAs
Canadian King's Counsel